Wilson Chisala Kalumba (c.28 February 1964 – 15 May 2018) was a Zambian politician who served as the mayor of Lusaka from 2016 until his death on 15 May 2018.

References

1960s births
Year of birth missing
2018 deaths
Mayors of Lusaka